Le Torp-Mesnil is a commune in the Seine-Maritime department in the Normandy region in northern France.

Geography

Population

Places of interest
 The church of St. Henri, dating from the nineteenth century.
 Two sandstone crosses from the seventeenth century.

See also
Communes of the Seine-Maritime department

References

External links

Website of the commune 

Communes of Seine-Maritime